Mélanie Cohl represented Belgium at the Eurovision Song Contest 1998 after winning the national final selection with the song "Dis oui".

Before Eurovision

Finale Nationale Concours Eurovision de la Chanson 1998 
The final took place on 13 March 1998 at the RTBF studios in Brussels, hosted by Jean-Pierre Hautier. The winner, "Dis oui" performed by Mélanie Cohl, was determined solely by a public televote. The results of the public televote were revealed by Belgium's six regions (four Walloon provinces with votes from Namur and Luxembourg being combined, a "Rest of Belgium" region covering the five Flemish provinces and Brussels) and led to the victory of Cohl with 15,424 votes.

At Eurovision
Mélanie Cohl performed 20th in the running order on the night of the contest. "Dis oui" went on place 6th with 122 points. It was the first time Belgium finished in the top 10 since their victory in 1986.

Voting

References

External links
Belgian National Final page

1998
Countries in the Eurovision Song Contest 1998
Eurovision